This is a list of banks in Russia.

Banks 
There are 396 operating banks in Russia (263 banks with a universal license, 133 - from the base). (March 1, 2020)

See also 

 List of financial regulatory authorities by country
 Banking in Russia
 SPFS
 List of banks

References

External links
 Central Bank of Russia
 Banks in Russia

Russia
Banks
Russia
Russia